John Reed Sr. (November 11, 1751 – February 17, 1831) was a Representative from Massachusetts.

Born in Framingham in the Province of Massachusetts Bay, Reed moved with his parents to Titicut Parish, in the northwestern part of Middleboro in 1756. He graduated from Yale College in 1772, studied theology, and was ordained as a Congregational minister in 1780. He served as a chaplain in the United States Navy for two years, then  moved to West Bridgewater, Massachusetts in 1780, where he became pastor of the First Congregational Society, which position he retained until his death. He was elected as a Federalist to the Fourth, Fifth, and Sixth Congresses (March 4, 1795 – March 3, 1801). He was not a candidate for renomination in 1800. He again resumed his ministerial duties, and died in West Bridgewater, Plymouth County, Massachusetts. Interment was in the Old Graveyard.

He was the father of John Reed Jr. (1781–1860), a Representative from Massachusetts.

References

External links

 

Yale College alumni
1751 births
1831 deaths
People from West Bridgewater, Massachusetts
United States Navy chaplains
Federalist Party members of the United States House of Representatives from Massachusetts
Military personnel from Massachusetts